Club Sport Marítimo is a handball team based in Funchal, Portugal, and is part of the C.S. Marítimo sports club. They currently compete in the top-tier Liga Portuguesa de Andebol, after stepping up from the Divisão de Elite in 2009. Before being accepted into the premier division, Marítimo was a dominant force in the Divisão de Elite, having been crowned Champions for the 2006-07 and 2007-08 season's.

See also
C.S. Marítimo

C.S. Marítimo
Maritimo
Maritimo
1973 establishments in Portugal